Boxing at the 2010 Commonwealth Games was held at the Talkatora Stadium. The training venue for the event was in Delhi University 4 Rings. The events took place on 5 - 11, 13 October 2010.

Medal summary

Medal table

Participating nations

See also
 Boxing at the 1930 British Empire Games
 Boxing at the 1986 Commonwealth Games
 Boxing at the 1990 Commonwealth Games
 Boxing at the 2002 Commonwealth Games
 Boxing at the 2006 Commonwealth Games
 Boxing at the 2014 Commonwealth Games

References 

 
2010 Commonwealth Games events
Boxing at the Commonwealth Games